The S.A. Engineering College is an autonomous engineering college in Veeraraghavapuram near Thiruverkadu, Chennai, Tamil Nadu, India. The college was awarded ISO 9001:2008 certificate for academic standard by TUV. The college is accredited by NBA and NAAC with 'A' grade.

The Dharma Naidu Educational and Charitable Trust started functioning under the leadership of D. Sudharssanam, a former M.L.A. The S.A. Engineering College was established in the Academic Year 1998–99 with the approval of the AICTE and affiliation with the University of Madras and the general policy of the Government of Tamil Nadu to give high priority to technical education.

Courses offered

Undergraduate courses
 B.Tech. - Information Technology
 B.E. - Computer Science and Engineering
 B.E.- Artificial Intelligence and Machine Learning
 B.E. - Electrical and Electronics Engineering
 B.E. - Electronics and Communication Engineering
 B.E. - Mechanical Engineering
 B.E. - Civil Engineering
 Humanities and Science

Post-graduate courses
 M.E. Computer Science and Engineering
 M.E. Communication System
 M.E. Embedded System Technologies
 M.E. CAD/CAM
 Master of Computer Applications
 Master of Business Administration

Campus

The campus is located at Poonamallee-avadi road. The campus is spread across . The campus has facilities such as laboratories, workshops, canteens, conference hall, gymnasium and hostels.

Library
The library has a total area of 1200 metres. It has more than 50,000 books. International and national level journals are collected here. Newspapers and Magazines in English, Tamil and Telugu are kept. Study materials for students are also kept available.

Other facilities

Sports
There are separate courts for sports such as badminton, football, basketball, cricket, tennis and volleyball.

Seminar hall
There are two seminars that have a capacity of up to two hundred

Canteen
At the same time, there is a canteen where four hundred people can eat. A small bakery is also attached.

Accommodation
There are separate hostels for men and women.

Transport
There are 35 college buses to reach various parts of Chennai.

References

Engineering colleges in Chennai
Educational institutions established in 1998